Chips is a nickname which may refer to:
 Henry Channon (1897–1958), British MP and diarist
 Chips Hardy (born 1950), English screenwriter, novelist, playwright, and creative director
 Chips Keswick (born 1940), British businessman
 Chips Kiesbye, guitarist for the Swedish band Sator
 Chips Mackinolty (born 1954), involved in the campaigns against the war in Vietnam by producing posters
 Chips Moman (1937–2016), American record producer, guitarist and songwriter
 Chips Rafferty (1909–1971), Australian actor born John William Pilbean Goffage
 Chips Sobek (1920–1990), player in the National Basketball Association

See also 

 
 
 Chip (nickname)
 Chipper (nickname)
 Chippy (nickname)

Lists of people by nickname